The Siemens-Halske Sh 12 was a nine-cylinder, air-cooled, radial engine for aircraft built in Germany in the 1920s. First run in 1925, it was rated at 80 kW (110 hp). The Sh 12 was also produced in the United States by Ryan Aeronautical Corp. as the Ryan-Siemens 9.

Applications
 Albatros L 68
 Albatros L 79
 Arado S I
 Arado W 2
 BFW M.21
 BFW M.27
 Bücker Bü 133
 Command-Aire 3C3-B
 Lampich BL-6
 Raab-Katzenstein KL.1
 Udet U 8
 Udet U 11 Kondor
 Udet U 12
 VL Sääski
 Weiss-EM-10 Ölyv
 Lóczy Hungária

References
 bungartz.nl

Aircraft air-cooled radial piston engines
Siemens-Halske aircraft engines
1920s aircraft piston engines